Malique Thompson-Dwyer (born 2 February 1998) is an English actor, known for portraying the role of Prince McQueen in the Channel 4 soap opera Hollyoaks from 2016 to 2019 and 2021 onwards.

Career
Thompson-Dwyer's first on-screen acting role was as Tommo in the CBBC children's drama The Dumping Ground. In 2016, he joined the Channel 4 soap opera Hollyoaks as Prince McQueen, the son of Goldie McQueen (Chelsee Healey) and the twin brother of Hunter McQueen (Theo Graham). His first appearance was in the episode shown on 17 November 2016. For his work in Hollyoaks, Thompson-Dwyer won "Best Partnership" at the British Soap Awards 2018, alongside Theo Graham. In 2019, Thompson-Dwyer departed from the cast of Hollyoaks. It was confirmed in Summer 2021 that he will return with his return airing in September 2021.

In 2017, Thompson-Dwyer appeared as young Wet Stick in the film King Arthur: Legend of the Sword. In November 2018, it was announced that he would compete in the eighteenth series of I'm a Celebrity...Get Me Out of Here!, making him the youngest contestant on the show, and was the second to be eliminated on 2 December 2018. In 2020, he appeared in the eighth series of Celebs Go Dating and in December in Celeb Ex in the City. The following year, he competed on the MTV series Celebs on the Farm.

Personal life
Thompson-Dwyer has two daughters born in 2017 and 2022.

References

External links
 

1998 births
Black British male actors
English male soap opera actors
Male actors from Oldham
English people of Jamaican descent
Living people
I'm a Celebrity...Get Me Out of Here! (British TV series) participants